Räbke is a municipality in the district of Helmstedt, in Lower Saxony, Germany. It is part of the collective municipality (Samtgemeinde) of Nord-Elm. The village is situated north of the wooded Elm hill range at the Schunter river.

The settlement was first mentioned as Ridepe in a 1205 deed. Since the 16th century Räbke was known for its paper mills meeting the needs of the University of Helmstedt.

References

Helmstedt (district)
Schunter